Trancers 5: Sudden Deth is a 1994 American sci-fi fantasy adventure film written by Peter David, directed by David Nutter, and starring Tim Thomerson as the time-traveling "trancer hunter" Jack Deth. It marked, to date, Thomerson's last appearance as Jack Deth, excluding his cameo in Evil Bong.

The fifth installment of the Trancers series was filmed back-to-back with Trancers 4: Jack of Swords and is the fourth entry released under the Full Moon Features banner.

The film has been released on DVD through the Trancers boxset.

Synopsis
Jack is back for one more round with the Trancers. Jack Deth must attempt to find his way home from the other-dimensional world of Orpheus, where magic works and the Trancers were the ruling class (before Trancers 4: Jack of Swords, that is). Jack's quest to find the mystical Diamond in the Castle of Unrelenting Terror may be thwarted by the return of Caliban, King of the Trancers who was once thought dead.

Cast
 Tim Thomerson as Jack Deth
 Stacie Randall as Lyra
 Ty Miller as Prospero
 Terri Ivens as Shaleen
 Mark Arnold as Lucius
 Clabe Hartley as Lord Caliban
 Alan Oppenheimer as Farr
 Jeff Moldovan as Harson
 Stephen Macht as Harris
 Luana Stoica as Celia
 Rona Hartner as Tessa
 Ion Haiduc as Angelo
 Mihai Dinvale as Defiant Noble

External links
 

1994 films
1994 action comedy films
1994 science fiction films
1990s English-language films
1990s science fiction comedy films
1990s science fiction action films
American science fiction comedy films
American science fiction action films
American sequel films
Films directed by David Nutter
Films shot in Romania
Trancers (film series)
1990s American films